Hammack is a surname. Notable people with the surname include:

Bobby Hammack (1922-1990), American musician
Craig Hammack, American special effects supervisor
Katherine Hammack, American government official
Mal Hammack (1933–2004), American college and professional football player
William S. Hammack (born 1961), American chemical engineer